Reject All American is the second studio album by the American punk rock band Bikini Kill, released in 1996 by Kill Rock Stars.

Recording and release 
Reject All American was recorded in November 1995 and produced by John Goodmanson. The album was released  on April 5, 1996, by the independent record label Kill Rock Stars.

Critical reception 

Reject All American received generally favorable reviews from music critics. David Browne of Entertainment Weekly opined that the album is "28 wonderfully concentrated minutes of unrelenting punk, with mid-tempo stops that pay homage to Kurt Cobain and Tony Randall. The Go-Go's as riot grrrls." Robert Christgau praised Kathleen Hanna's vocals and Billy Karren's guitar playing, stating that they add definition and confidence.

Track listing

Personnel 
Kathleen Hanna – vocals, bass, drums 
Tobi Vail – drums, vocals
Kathi Wilcox – bass, vocals, drums 
Billy Karren – guitar

References

External links 

1996 albums
Bikini Kill albums
Kill Rock Stars albums
Albums produced by John Goodmanson